Nick Orr (born October 6, 1995) is an American football safety who is currently a free agent. He was signed by the Chicago Bears as an undrafted free agent in 2018. He played college football at TCU.

Early life
Orr grew up in DeSoto, Texas in very athletic family.  His father, Terry Orr, played eight seasons in the NFL and won two Super Bowl rings with the Washington Redskins.  His eldest brother, Terrance, played football at Texas State. Zach Orr, another older brother, played at North Texas before spending three seasons with the Baltimore Ravens. Nick's younger brother, Chris, played at Wisconsin and signed as an undrafted free agent with the Carolina Panthers on April, 26, 2020.

At DeSoto High School, Orr was a four-year starter for the Eagles who was named Honorable Mention All-State his junior and senior seasons.  He verbally committed to play at TCU in the summer before his senior season, and signed his national letter of intent with the Horned Frogs on February 5, 2014.

College career
Orr recorded his first collegiate interception in his debut for TCU in a road game against SMU as true freshman in 2014, a season in which the Frogs would go on to win a Big 12 championship and rank third in the final polls after blowing out Ole Miss, 42-3, in the Peach Bowl.  He started 39 games for the TCU in the next three seasons, ending his college career with 126 tackles, 1 sack, 9 interceptions and 3 fumble recoveries.  He helped the Frogs win the Alamo Bowl twice and was named 2nd Team All-Big 12 as a junior in 2016 and 1st Team All-Big 12 as a senior in 2017.

Professional career

Chicago Bears
After going undrafted in the 2018 NFL Draft, Orr signed with the Chicago Bears on May 12, 2018 as an undrafted free agent. He played in all five of the Bears' preseason games, but was released by the Bears during final team cuts on September 1.

San Antonio Commanders
On December 7, 2018, Orr signed with the San Antonio Commanders of the new Alliance of American Football. He was waived on February 28, 2019.

References

External links
 TCU Horned Frogs bio

Living people
1995 births
American football defensive backs
Chicago Bears players
People from DeSoto, Texas
Players of American football from Texas
San Antonio Commanders players
Sportspeople from the Dallas–Fort Worth metroplex
TCU Horned Frogs football players